Benny Caiola (1930 – 22 April 2010) was an Italian entrepreneur most widely known for owning a large Ferrari and other exotic cars collection.

Early life and career

Car collection

Benny Caiola owned an automotive collection which, according to Forbes Magazine, was viewed as one of the most exclusive Ferrari collections around the world. He was also the first client to ever order a car from Pagani, which gave the company reason to name a special edition of their second production car, the Pagani Huayra, after his initials, making it the Huayra BC. This Huayra BC was supposed to be limited to 20 cars, though 30 were actually made. The car debuted at the Geneva Motor Show in 2016, almost six years after Caiola's death. At the end of July 2019 Pagani released the new Pagani Huayra Roadster BC, an open-top version of the Huayra BC.

A selection of the cars included in his collection is given below:

 1973 Dino 246 GT
 1990 Ferrari F40
 1995 Ferrari F50
 1999 Ferrari 333 SP
 2002 Enzo Ferrari
 2005 Maserati MC12
 2006 Ferrari FXX Evoluzione (number 20)
 2007 Aston Martin DBS
 2007 Ferrari F430 Challenge
 2008 Ferrari 430 Scuderia
 2008 Mercedes-Benz SLR McLaren
 2009 Lamborghini Gallardo LP 560-4
 2010 Ferrari 599 GTB Fiorano HGTE

The collection was put on sale on December 28, 2010 at Gooding & Company.

Relationship with Pagani

Benny Caiola was a friend of Horacio Pagani, the founder of Pagani Automobili and the first customer of a Pagani Zonda, the company's first automobile.

After his death a version of the Pagani Huayra (the successor of the Zonda), named "Huayra BC" (Benny Caiola) which is a track focused variant of the original model was unveiled at the 2016 Geneva Motor Show in his honour.

Later, in July 2019, an open-top variant of the BC called the Huayra Roadster BC was unveiled.

Death 
Benny Caiola died in New York City on 22 April 2010, aged 79.

References

1930 births
2010 deaths
People from San Fratello
Car collectors
Businesspeople from Sicily